6-Phosphogluconic acid (6-phosphogluconate) is an intermediate in the pentose phosphate pathway and the Entner–Doudoroff pathway.

It is formed by 6-phosphogluconolactonase, and acted upon by phosphogluconate dehydrogenase to produce ribulose 5-phosphate. It may also be acted upon by 6-phosphogluconate dehydratase to produce 2-keto-3-deoxy-6-phosphogluconate.

Organophosphates